Cavan Clerkin (born 1973) is a British actor and filmmaker from Hackney, London.

Career
Clerkin has appeared in various TV shows including Smack the Pony, The Inbetweeners and The IT Crowd, and feature films Gangster No. 1, Pierrepoint, and Muscle. He co-wrote and starred in the comedy series Los Dos Bros (2002) with Darren Boyd. He played alongside Sharon Horgan in BAFTA nominated sitcom Pulling (2006–2009), and appeared in the soap opera EastEnders (2009) as Joel Reynolds. He played Leonard Glickman in TV thriller The Shadow Line (2011); and DCI Gerring in the ITV drama Lucan (2013). He wrote, produced and starred in the independent feature film Nice Guy (2012). He played Clarkey in the police satire Babylon (2014), directed by Danny Boyle, and appeared in the BBC sitcom Count Arthur Strong (2014). In 2016 he played Vinnie Mann, a talent manager in Morgana Robinson's The Agency. He plays Father Pyrlig in the Netflix drama The Last Kingdom (2017-2022), and Detective Sergeant Flynn in the BBC surveillance thriller The Capture (2019–).

Awards
Clerkin's co-created series Los Dos Bros won a Silver Rose at Montreux in 2002.

In 2019 he won Best Actor award at the Tallinn Black Nights Film Festival for his performance in Gerard Johnson's psychological thriller Muscle (2019).

References

English male television actors
English television writers
1973 births
Living people
British male television writers